Imma philomena is a moth in the family Immidae. It was described by John Frederick Gates Clarke in 1986. It is found on the Marquesas Islands.

References

Moths described in 1986
Immidae
Moths of Oceania